A police riot is a riot carried out by the police; more specifically, it is a riot that police are responsible for instigating, escalating or sustaining as a violent confrontation. Police riots are often characterized by widespread police brutality, and they may be done for the purpose of political repression.

The term "police riot" was popularized after its use in the Walker Report, which investigated the events surrounding the 1968 Democratic National Convention in Chicago to describe the "unrestrained and indiscriminate" violence that Chicago Police Department officers "inflicted upon persons who had broken no law, disobeyed no order, made no threat." During the 2020 George Floyd protests, columnist Jamelle Bouie wrote in The New York Times that a police riot is "an assertion of power and impunity" that "does more to inflame and agitate protesters than it does to calm the situation and bring order to the streets."

History

United States

Haymarket Riot

During the early years of labor union organizing, police violence was frequently used in efforts to quell protesting workers. One notable incident took place in May 1886, when police killed four striking workers at the McCormick Harvesting Machine Co. in Chicago. The following day, a peaceful demonstration in Haymarket Square erupted in violence when a bomb was thrown, killing eight policemen. Other police then opened fire, before or after they were fired on by people in the crowd (accounts vary) killing at least four demonstrators and wounding an undetermined number, in an event known as the Haymarket Riot; the events have been referred to as a police riot.

Bloody Thursday

In July 1934, police in San Francisco were involved in several encounters with striking longshore workers.  After two picketers were killed, the other area unions joined together and called a general strike of all workers (the "Big Strike"). Subsequent criticism of the police was probably the occasion for the coining of the term "police riot".

Vietnam War protests

During the Vietnam War, anti-war demonstrators frequently clashed with police, who were equipped with billy clubs and tear gas. The demonstrators claimed that the attacks were unprovoked; the authorities claimed the demonstrators were rioting. The most notorious of these assaults, which was shown on television and which included national television reporters in the chaos, took place during the August 1968 Democratic National Convention in Chicago, which was the scene of significant anti-war street protests. The actions of the police were later described as a police riot by the Walker Report to the U.S. National Commission on the Causes and Prevention of Violence.

White Night Riots

On May 21, 1979, in response to early demonstrations and unrest at San Francisco City Hall following the sentencing of Dan White for the killings of San Francisco Mayor George Moscone and Supervisor Harvey Milk, members of the San Francisco Police Department descended on the Castro District. With tape over their numbers they destroyed a gay bar and indiscriminately attacked civilians. Many patrons were beaten by police in riot gear, some two dozen arrests were made, and a number of people later sued the SFPD for their actions.

Tompkins Square Park police riot

In August 1988, a riot erupted in Tompkins Square Park in the East Village of New York City when police, some mounted on horseback, attempted to enforce a newly passed curfew for the park. Bystanders, artists, residents, homeless people, reporters, and political activists were caught up in the police action that took place during the night of August 6–7. Videotape evidence, provided by onlookers and participants, showed seemingly unprovoked violent acts by the police, as well as a number of officers having covered up or removed their names and badge numbers from their uniforms. The footage was broadcast on local television, resulting in widespread public awareness. In an editorial The New York Times dubbed the incident a "police riot".

Castro Sweep 

On October 6, 1989, about 200 members of the San Francisco Police Department initiated a police riot in the Castro District following a peaceful march held by ACT UP to protest the United States government's actions during the ongoing AIDS pandemic. The event was the first large-scale confrontation between the city's LGBT community and the police since the White Night riots a decade earlier and resulted in 53 arrests and 14 people injured.

1999 Seattle Protests 

The term police riot has been applied by some to the 1999 Seattle WTO protests, where police clad in riot gear used clubs, tear gas and projectiles to disperse groups of protesters.

2014 Ferguson protests

During the Ferguson unrest, police clad in riot gear used clubs, tear gas and rubber bullets to disperse crowds of protestors in Ferguson. Long Range Acoustic Devices and armored vehicles were heavily utilized to subdue protestors, and police threatened journalists and human rights workers on the scene. Some sources and observers described the event as a police riot, though the police denied any wrongdoing or police riot.

George Floyd protests

Police were accused in multiple cities of instigating unprovoked violence with persons who protested the murder of George Floyd in Minneapolis, Minnesota. Democratic Socialist Virginia State Rep. Lee J. Carter criticized police actions as a "police riot".

Videos from multiple cities showed police using tear gas, pepper spray, and rubber bullets on protestors. In Seattle, a line of police officers attacked a crowd of protestors when a protestor would not relinquish her umbrella. In Richmond, Virginia, police ended four days of peaceful protest by attacking protestors with pepper spray; police later admitted it was an "unwarranted action" and mayor Levar Stoney apologized, saying "we violated your rights."

United Kingdom

Battle of the Beanfield

During an attempt to enforce an exclusion zone around Stonehenge, Wiltshire, in 1985, the police entered the field where a group of travelers known as the Peace Convoy were being detained and began damaging their vehicles and beating the occupants.  The travelers eventually sued the Wiltshire police force for wrongful arrest, assault and criminal damage.

Hong Kong

2019 Hong Kong anti-extradition bill protests

See also 

2010 Thai political protests
2013 Bangladesh riot
Black Act
Black bloc
Demonstration (people)
Hooliganism
Kristallnacht (November 9 & 10, 1938)
Memorial Day massacre of 1937, aka the Republic Steel massacre
Police brutality
Stonewall riots (June 28 – July 1, 1969)

External links 
Cedar Avenue Valentines Police Riot

References

Law enforcement
Riots
Police misconduct
Police brutality